The Women's EuroHockey Indoor Championship is an international women's indoor hockey competition organized by the European Hockey Federation. The winning team becomes the champion of Europe. The tournament serves as a qualification tournament for the Women's Indoor Hockey World Cup.

The tournament is part of the EuroHockey Indoor Championships and is the highest level in the women's competition. The lowest two teams each year are relegated to the EuroHockey Indoor Championship II and replaced by the highest two teams from that competition. From 2024 onwards the tournament will be played with ten instead of eight teams.

The tournament has been won by five different teams: Germany has the most titles with sixteen, the Netherlands has two titles and England, Ukraine and Belarus have won the tournament once. The most recent edition was held in Hamburg, Germany and was won by Germany. The next edition will be held in 2024.

Results

Summary

* = hosts

Team appearances

See also
Men's EuroHockey Indoor Championship
Women's EuroHockey Indoor Championship II
Women's EuroHockey Championship

References

External links
European Hockey Federation

 
Women 1
Indoor hockey
EuroHockey Indoor Championship
EuroHockey Indoor Championship